The Winchester manuscript may refer to:
 the oldest surviving manuscript of the Anglo-Saxon Chronicle, which is now in Cambridge
 a manuscript of Malory's Le Morte d'Arthur, which is now in the British Library